The first edition of the football tournament at the Pan American Games was held in Buenos Aires, Argentina, from February 25 to March 8, 1951. Five teams did compete, after Brazil withdrew on February 16, 1951.

Paraguay participated with the club side Club Sport Colombia, strengthened with some guest players from other clubs. Costa Rica and Venezuela entered their full national teams (as they only had amateur football domestically).

Competition

Final table

Match results

Medalists

Goalscorers

Bibliography
  .

References

1951
Events at the 1951 Pan American Games
Pan American Games
1951 Pan American Games
1951 Pan American Games